Úžice is a municipality and village in Kutná Hora District in the Central Bohemian Region of the Czech Republic. It has about 700 inhabitants.

Administrative parts
Villages of Benátky, Čekanov, Chrastná, Františkov, Karlovice, Mělník, Nechyba, Radvanice and Smrk are administrative parts of Úžice.

In popular culture
The 1403 recreation of the village, called Uzhitz, was prominently featured in Czech role-playing game Kingdom Come: Deliverance.

References

Villages in Kutná Hora District